The Miss Ecuador 1994 was held on April 3, 1994. Where 12 candidates competed for the national title. In the end of the night Ariana Mandini from Guayas crowned to Mafalda Arboleda from Guayas as Miss Ecuador 1994. The Miss Ecuador competed at Miss Universe 1994.

Results

Placements

Special awards

Contestants

Casting

A casting was held in 1994 to select an Ecuadorian representative to compete at Miss World 1994.

Notes

Returns

Last compete in:

1992 
 Esmeraldas

External links

Miss Ecuador
1994 beauty pageants
Beauty pageants in Ecuador
1994 in Ecuador